Berthold is a town in Ward County, North Dakota, United States. The population was 490 at the 2020 census.

History
Berthold was founded in 1900.

Geography
Berthold is located at  (48.316025, -101.735776).

Demographics

Berthold is part of the Minot Micropolitan Statistical Area.

2010 census
As of the census of 2010, there were 454 people in 166 households, including 120 families, in the town. The racial makup of the town was 98.7% White, 0.2% African American, and 1.1% from two or more races. Hispanic or Latino of any race were 1.8%.

Of the 166 households 37.3% had children under the age of 18 living with them, 63.3% were married couples living together, 5.4% had a female householder with no husband present, 3.6% had a male householder with no wife present, and 27.7% were non-families. 25.3% of households were one person and 9.6% were one person aged 65 or older. The average household size was 2.73 and the average family size was 3.31.

The median age was 37.2 years. 33.3% of residents were under the age of 18; 4.5% were between the ages of 18 and 24; 26% were from 25 to 44; 22.8% were from 45 to 64; and 13.2% were 65 or older. The gender makeup of the town was 52.2% male and 47.8% female.

2000 census
As of the census of 2000, there were 466 people in 170 households, including 131 families, in the town. The population density was 1,214.7 people per square mile (473.5/km). There were 181 housing units at an average density of 471.8 per square mile (183.9/km). The racial makup of the town was 98.07% White, 0.21% African American, 0.21% Asian, 0.43% from other races, and 1.07% from two or more races. Hispanic or Latino of any race were 1.29% of the population.

Of the 170 households 40.6% had children under the age of 18 living with them, 69.4% were married couples living together, 5.3% had a female householder with no husband present, and 22.9% were non-families. 21.8% of households were one person and 14.1% were one person aged 65 or older. The average household size was 2.74 and the average family size was 3.21.

The age distribution was 31.8% under the age of 18, 4.5% from 18 to 24, 32.0% from 25 to 44, 16.5% from 45 to 64, and 15.2% 65 or older. The median age was 34 years. For every 100 females, there were 99.1 males. For every 100 females age 18 and over, there were 101.3 males.

The median household income was $35,000 and the median family income  was $43,500. Males had a median income of $28,250 versus $20,000 for females. The per capita income for the town was $17,683. About 5.6% of families and 6.6% of the population were below the poverty line, including 6.8% of those under age 18 and 10.7% of those age 65 or over.

Education
It is within the Lewis and Clark School District, which formed in 2003 when the Berthold School District merged with two other school districts. There is one school, Berthold Public School.

Site of interest:
 Berthold Public School Arboretum

See also
 List of oil pipelines

References

Cities in North Dakota
Cities in Ward County, North Dakota
Populated places established in 1900
Minot, North Dakota micropolitan area
1900 establishments in North Dakota